Red Scarf British Life Handbook (Chinese name 红领巾英国生活指南）is a platform launched by Red Scarf Limited company. The Red Scarf British Life Handbook is a website about how Chinese people live in the UK.

The company name came from ‘Honglingjin' in Chinese Pinyin, which is a symbol of young students in primary and middle school in China since 1949. The company was created by Pauline Guo in 2012. The British Red Scarf provides information on shopping, food, travelling, lifestyle, and tips.

Shopping
The website is a guide for popular British supermarkets such as Sainsbury, Tesco, M&S and Asda.

Food
The categories of the food handbook on the platform is integrated, which can be divided into breakfast, lunch, and dinner recommendation. It also has frozen food, fruits & vegetables, condiments, and snacks suggestion. The seasonal food map is another classified field from the main website.

Travelling
The travel topic includes travel destination suggestions, visa applications, hotels, and the local cultural introduction. On the Red Scarf official Weibo, there are more than 20 thousand articles linked about travelling which could be seen as an E-travel agency.

Lifestyle & tips
Overseas lifestyle and advice are Red Scarf British handbook’s another feature for Chinese students who will are getting ready to study in the UK. In 2017, the Red Scarf official website launched a preparation guide named the ‘2017 British Red Scarf life guide report’. The life handbook is composed of 7 chapters, which are preparation, residential, section, life, financial, journal, and safety chapter. Through the brief guide pieces of information, these tips basically contain all the common living knowledge that every Chinese student needed to know in English life.

Improvements
After four years of hard work, currently, the company is aimed to refine the basic articles and switch to searching and browsing for more useful pieces of information which enable people easier to find from the digital marketing aspects. Customers only need to click on a few simple words, the system will search through the intelligent terms automatically. With the popularity of smartphones and the flourishing of social networks, in the past two years, the Red Scarf platform has increasingly focused its business on related apps, such as WeChat or Weibo. In terms of digital marketing, the Red Scarf British handbook is not only a helper which improves the overseas Chinese students have a more interesting life in the UK but also the middleman which creates a link between the average students and merchants, through the media advertising style.

References

External links
 Official Website

Chinese books